5 Persei is a star in the northern constellation of Perseus located around  away from the Sun. It is part of the Perseus OB1 stellar association and lies near the Double Cluster. This object is near the lower limit of visibility to the naked eye with an apparent visual magnitude of +6.35. It is moving closer to the Earth with a heliocentric radial velocity of −34 km/s.

This is a blue supergiant of spectral type B5 Ia; a massive star that has used up its core hydrogen and expanded into a very luminous star. It has an effective temperature around 15,000 K and is radiating 83,000 times the Sun's luminosity. Several studies of 5 Persei have detected possible small amplitude variations.  In 1983, an amplitude of 0.045 magnitudes was measured with a possible period of eight days.  An analysis of Hipparcos photometry showed an amplitude of 0.0168 magnitudes and a period of 2.65 days.  The statistical signal was strong enough for the variability to be very likely, but 5 Persei has not formally been catalogued as a variable star.

5 Persei has two nearby companions, a 12th magnitude star 5.7 arc-seconds away and a 13th magnitude star one arc-minute away.

References

Perseus (constellation)
Persei, 05
B-type supergiants
Triple stars
0627
Suspected variables
013267
010227
BD+56 0438